The Logan River is a  tributary of the Little Bear River in Utah, the United States. It is currently being studied to determine whether it is suitable for National Wild and Scenic Rivers designation.

Course 
The Logan River rises in the Bear River Mountains in Idaho and flows south, then southwest through Logan Canyon and the Wasatch-Cache National Forest to the city of Logan, Utah, in the Cache Valley.

The river is dammed at the 1st, 2nd, and 3rd dams at the mouth of Logan Canyon.

See also
 List of rivers of Utah
 List of rivers of Idaho
 List of longest streams of Idaho

References

External links

Bear River (Great Salt Lake)
Rivers of Utah
Rivers of Cache County, Utah
Logan, Utah
Great Salt Lake watershed
Rivers of Idaho
Rivers of Franklin County, Idaho